Evgenia Kulikovskaya and Elena Tatarkova were the defending champions, but Kulikovskaya did not compete this year. Tatarkova teamed up with Martina Navratilova and lost in first round to Maria Elena Camerin and Flavia Pennetta.

Alicia Molik and Barbara Schett won the title by defeating Emmanuelle Gagliardi and Anna-Lena Grönefeld 6–3, 6–3 in the final.

Seeds

Draw

Draw

References

External links
 Official results archive (ITF)
 Official results archive (WTA)

Doubles
Nordea Nordic Light Open
Nordic